Senator Cornell may refer to:

Charles G. Cornell (1827–1906), New York State Senate
Ezra Cornell (1807–1874), New York State Senate
Francis R. E. Cornell (1821–1881), New York State Senate
George W. Cornell (1896–1988), New York State Senate